Mayday is a British drama thriller television series shown on BBC One, starring Sophie Okonedo, Aidan Gillen, Peter Firth, and Lesley Manville.

Development and production 
The series' commission was announced on 27 April 2012 by the BBC Media Centre. The series was filmed in Dorking, Surrey, making use of street settings including the high street area, Cotmandene (an open grassed area close to the town centre), a kebab shop on the corner of Dene Street and Leith Hill. The old magistrates court was used as the police station and the production was based in Pippbrook House which had housed the town library.

Premise 
Thriller series about the sudden disappearance of a 14-year-old girl in a small town with a relatively affluent rural setting and strong pagan traditions.  The locals are galvanized to work with the police to find her.  Ex-copper Fiona, frustrated with her present life soon becomes involved.  Her policeman husband's career is hanging in the balance following an accusation of assault on duty.  The stress he is under adjusts his disposition and lends itself to doubts - in his wife's mind - concerning his propriety and morality.

It is an investigative drama with a difference - the action is centred on the community figures and not the detectives.

Cast and characters 
Leila Mimmack as Hattie, the missing young May Queen, and as, Caitlin, Hattie's more rebellious twin sister who has always felt that she lived in her sister's shadow.
Peter Firth as Malcolm, a very successful local public figure, proud of his achievements and self-made millions.
Sophie Okonedo as Fiona, an ex police officer who has left the force to look after her three children.
Aidan Gillen as Everett, a funny, irreverent and spontaneous person until his life was destroyed by the tragic death of his wife in suspicious circumstances.
Lesley Manville as Gail, Malcolm's wife who is trapped in an almost loveless marriage.
Peter McDonald as Alan, a tough, no nonsense and strait-laced policeman.
Tom Fisher as Seth, a man with a personality disorder who spends most of his time in the woods.
Sam Spruell as Steve, who is driven by a strong sense of responsibility and a need to prove himself.
Max Fowler as Linus, an intelligent, funny and assured teenager who also has a darker side.

Episodes

DVD release

The complete series of Mayday was released by Acorn Media UK on 8 April 2013.

References

External links
 
 

2010s British drama television series
2013 British television series debuts
2013 British television series endings
2010s British crime television series
BBC television dramas
2010s British television miniseries
Television shows set in England
Television series by Endemol
English-language television shows